Yekaterina Nikolayevna Strokova (Cyrillic: Екатерина Николаевна Строкова; born 17 December 1989 in Lipetsk) is a Russian athlete whose specialty is the discus throw. She represented her country at two consecutive World Championships, in 2013 and 2015, failing to qualify for the final on both occasions.

Her personal best in the event is 65.78 metres set in Moscow in 2014.

Competition record

References

External links
 

1989 births
Living people
Place of birth missing (living people)
Russian female discus throwers
Competitors at the 2009 Summer Universiade
World Athletics Championships athletes for Russia
Russian Athletics Championships winners
Sportspeople from Lipetsk